Endschütz is a German municipality in the Thuringian district of Greiz. It belongs to the Verwaltungsgemeinschaft of Wünschendorf/Elster.

Geography

Neighboring municipalities
Communities near Endschütz include the City of Berga (Elster), Linda bei Weida, and Wünschendorf/Elster; as well as the free city of Gera.

Municipal subdivisions
Endschütz has only one large subdivision, Letzendorf.

References

Greiz (district)
Grand Duchy of Saxe-Weimar-Eisenach